The 2019 Turkmenistan Higher League (Ýokary Liga) season was the 27th season Turkmenistan's professional football league, the highest football league competition in Turkmenistan. Altyn Asyr defended their championship, winning the Higher League for a six time.

League table

Results

Matches 1–14

Matches 15–28

^Altyn Asyr awarded 3–0 as Ahal forfeited

Teams

A total of 8 teams will contest the league.

Managerial changes

Top goal-scorers
The top scorers are: Updated to match played on 10 December 2019.

Scoring
First goalscorer: Baýramgeldi Gulmaýew (Köpetdag)

References

External links
 Ýokary Liga 2019
Football Federation of Turkmenistan

Turkmenistan
Ýokary Liga seasons
2019 in Turkmenistani football